Mamadev is a large village in Mohania block of Kaimur district, Bihar, India. It is located just east of Mohania. As of 2011, its population was 2,597, in 363 households.

References 

Villages in Kaimur district